Guttula galatheae is a species of sea snail, a marine gastropod mollusk in the family Seguenziidae.

Description
The height of the shell varies between 3.5 mm and 4 mm.

Distribution
This marine species occurs off New Zealand, in the Kermadec Trench at depths between 6,660 m and 6,770 m.

References

 Knudsen J. 1964. Scaphopoda and Gastropoda from depths exceeding 6000 meters. Galathea Report 7: 125–136, page(s): 127–129

galatheae
Gastropods described in 1964